Hans Egede House is located in Nuuk, Greenland. It is oldest house in the country and was built in 1728. It was originally the residence of Hans Egede, a Dano-Norwegian Lutheran missionary. Later it was the residence of the Greenlandic prime minister. It is currently used for official government receptions.

See also 

 Statue of Hans Egede

References

Buildings and structures in Nuuk
Houses completed in 1728
1728 establishments in North America